is a former Japanese football player.

Playing career
Takeda was born in Osaka Prefecture on March 22, 1965. After graduating from Osaka University of Health and Sport Sciences, he joined Honda in 1987. He became a regular goalkeeper from 1990. In 1994, he moved to Japan Football League club Cerezo Osaka. He played as regular goalkeeper and the club won the champions in 1994. Although the club was promoted to J1 League from 1995, he could hardly play in the match behind Gilmar Rinaldi and Seigo Shimokawa. He retired end of 1997 season.

Futsal career
In 1989, Takeda selected Japan national futsal team for 1989 Futsal World Championship in Netherlands.

Club statistics

References

External links

1965 births
Living people
Osaka University of Health and Sport Sciences alumni
Association football people from Osaka Prefecture
Japanese footballers
Japan Soccer League players
J1 League players
Japan Football League (1992–1998) players
Honda FC players
Cerezo Osaka players
Association football goalkeepers